Puller may refer to:

Fish 
 Several species in the genus Chromis
  One-spot puller or brown puller, Atypichthys latus
 Reticulated puller, Dascyllus reticulatus
 Spiny-tail puller, Acanthochromis polyacanthus
 White-spot puller, Dascyllus trimaculatus

Tools 
 Bearing puller
 Nail puller
 Wire puller or wire stretcher
Puller (dog sport tool)

People 
 Richard Puller (1747–1826), English merchant banker
 Sir  Christopher Puller (1774 – 26 May 1824), English lawyer; briefly Chief Justice of Bengal; son of Richard
  Chesty Puller, a United States Marine Corps officer during World War II and the Korean War, and the most decorated Marine in the history of the Corps
 Lewis Puller, son of Chesty Puller, who was maimed during the Vietnam War and took his own life due to complications from his injuries two and a half decades later

Other 
 Puller (computer gaming), a character in an MMORPG whose primary task in a party is to get the initial attention of the enemies and hand it off to the tank 
 Puller (band), an American rock band on Tooth and Nail Records during the 1990s